Goran Mrđen is a Croatian handball coach.

References

Living people
Year of birth missing (living people)
Croatian handball coaches
Sportspeople from Virovitica